The Republic of Vietnam national football team (Vietnamese: Đội tuyển bóng đá quốc gia Việt Nam Cộng hòa) was the national association football team representing the State of Vietnam and South Vietnam between 1949 or 1954 and 1976. The team took part in the first two Asian Cups finals (1956 and 1960), finishing fourth both times out of 4 teams.

The team ceased to exist when the North and South regions combined into the Socialist Republic of Vietnam. No matches were played between 1976 and 1990 and the first tournament the combined team played in was after 1991. Football record agencies count the South Vietnam matches as part of the all-time record of the Vietnam national team while considering North Vietnam team to be a separate team for statistical purposes.

Competitive record

FIFA World Cup

1974 FIFA World Cup qualification
The only World Cup qualification campaign which South Vietnam entered was the for the 1974 World Cup. They were placed in Zone A of the AFC and OFC qualification in Seoul, South Korea. On 16 May 1973 they beat Thailand 1–0 to qualify for Group 1. On 20 May, South Vietnam lost their opening game 0–4 to Japan and four days later they lost 1–0 to Hong Kong and were eliminated. Hong Kong and Japan advanced but neither got any further, losing play-offs for the next round to South Korea and Israel respectively.

Asian Cup

Asian Games

Southeast Asian Games

 1971: Pesta Sukan Cup (join-winners with India)

Head-to-head record
Key

The list shown below shows the South Vietnam national football team all-time international record against opposing nations.

See also
 Football in Vietnam

References

External links
 South Vietnam - List of International Matches at RSSSF.com

 
Former national association football teams in Asia
National sports teams established in 1949